OAA may refer to:

 Oakwood Adventist Academy
 Oceania Athletic Association
 Office of the Administrative Assistant to the Secretary of the Army
 Ohio Auctioneers Association
 Ohio Achievement Assessment
 Old Achimotans Association
 The Older Americans Act of 1965
 Oman Automobile Association, a member of the FIA
 Ontario Association of Architects
 Open Adoption Agreement
 Open Agent Architecture
 Open Automotive Alliance, an organization to computerize cars
 Optically active additive, for use in paints and coatings
 Opticians Association of America
 Optometrists Association Australia
 Oriental Astronomical Association
 Orlando Apopka Airport
 Oxaloacetic acid
 Oxford Aviation Academy
 Oxley Aviation, Australia (ICAO operator designator)
 Ozark Adventist Academy